Brooks High School is a government co-educational comprehensive junior secondary school located in , a northern suburb of , Tasmania, Australia. Established in 1948, the school caters for approximately 500 students from Years 7 to 10. The school is administered by the Tasmanian Department of Education.

In 2019 student enrolments were 436. The school principal is Louise Fisher.

The school services the Launceston northern suburbs of Invermay, Mayfield, Mowbray, Newnham, Ravenswood and Rocherlea.

History 
Brooks High School opened in 1948.  The school originally centred on a large blue gum tree, where it held assemblies. In 1990, the University of Tasmania incorporated these grounds and the school moved to its present site in Rocherlea.  The present site resembles the original grounds; both feature large open spaces and separate buildings.

In 1995, the school established the No Dole Program. The program's success led other Australian high schools to found similar programs. Speakers at the Program have included former prime minister John Howard, former education minister Brendan Nelson, former Labor Party Leader Kim Beazley, Hawthorn footballer Dermott Brereton, late motor racing driver Peter Brock, and former Australian cricket captain Ricky Ponting. Ponting also attended the school.

Notable alumni 

 Daniel Geale - boxer
 Ricky Ponting - cricketer 
 Charles Wooley - journalist

See also 
 List of schools in Tasmania
 Education in Tasmania

References

External links 
 Brooks High School website

Educational institutions established in 1938
Public high schools in Tasmania
Schools in Launceston, Tasmania
1938 establishments in Australia